The Honeyz are a British R&B girl group, composed of members Celena Cherry and Mariama Goodman. The group had five UK top 10 hits between 1998 and 2000, with "Finally Found" (1998), "End of the Line" (1998), "Love of a Lifetime" (1999), "Never Let You Down" (1999) and  "Won't Take It Lying Down" (2000). Their debut album was certified Gold by BPI. The Honeyz formed in 1998 with the original line-up consisting of Celena Cherry, Heavenli Abdi and Naima Belkhiati. Former Solid Harmonie member Mariama Goodman replaced Abdi on April 1999. Goodman left on August 2000 with Abdi rejoining, before the group disbanded for the first time in 2003.

The original line-up briefly reformed to appear on the ITV show Hit Me, Baby, One More Time in 2005, before the group returned officially in 2006 for a tour. Despite the 2005 appearance, Belkhiati did not want to return because she was focused on an acting career and was replaced by Celena's sister, Candace Cherry, as a performing member. Abdi left the band for the second time in August 2006 and was once again replaced by Goodman. They performed together on tour until 2010.

Celena Cherry, Abdi and Goodman re-formed for the 2013 ITV reality show The Big Reunion. This was the first time Abdi and Goodman appeared in the same line-up. The show first aired in January 2013 and followed six bands meeting for the first time since they split, and rehearsing for a comeback performance at the Hammersmith Apollo. They went on to perform in the successful 14-date Big Reunion arena tour in May 2013. Abdi once again left the group in 2014 and the group continued gigging as duo.

History

1997–2000: Formation, Wonder No.8 and Abdi's first departure
In 1997, Mercury Records cultivated the girl group Essence, made up of Heavenli Abdi and Celena Cherry. The duo were hailed as an R&B alternative to the Spice Girls and intended as a direct rival to American girl group Destiny's Child. According to Heavenli, "We felt that there was a place for a younger, vibey kind of 'pop R&B' group. We were looking at En Vogue as someone that we would like to aspire to." Celena admitted that Essence was "an OK name, but it wasn't really hitting it". One night, when Heavenli and Celena were departing from the nightclub Subterranea, a man exclaimed at them, "Mm mm, check out those honeys over there!". In 1998 Naima Belkhiati joined the line-up and the group was officially named as Honeyz.

Their debut single, "Finally Found" was released in August 1998 and peaked at number four in the UK Singles Chart and remains their biggest hit. "Finally Found" introduced the trio to the British public and went on to sell more than 350,000 copies. The follow-up, "End of the Line" notched up similar sales figures, peaking at number five. Their debut album Wonder No.8 went gold in the UK with sales of over 200,000 copies. Aside from their success in the United Kingdom, they performed with a full live orchestra in the Netherlands and 8,000 people at ChildLine in Dublin, duetted with Lionel Richie in Italy, and saw their first two singles, "Finally Found" and "End of the Line", go 2× platinum in Australia. In the United States, they signed to Def Jam/Island. The group ended up being featured on the French release of Foxy Brown's single "J.O.B." from her second album Chyna Doll, and they also worked with producer Stevie J (Toni Braxton, Deborah Cox, Puff Daddy).

During their second promotional trip to Australia in March 1999, Naima and Celena heard that Heavenli had decided to quit the group for personal reasons, including spending more time with her boyfriend, Matthew Marsden. Naima remarked: "Of course, it was a big shock. But we respect her decision, and we wish her a lot of luck in whatever she decides to do." There were various reasons why Heavenli left the group – these included being unhappy with touring internationally, and wanting to start a solo career.

Heavenli departed the group in the middle of promotion for the group's third single "Love of a Lifetime" which reached number 9 in the UK charts. The gap left by Heavenli's departure opened an opportunity for former Solid HarmoniE vocalist Mariama Goodman. Her arrival was announced exclusively on BBC One's Live & Kicking on 10 April 1999. The new line-up performed over the summer of 1999, at venues including London's Mardi Gras and Capital Radio's Party in the Park concert in Hyde Park in July. At the radio extravaganza, performing in front of 100,000 people, the Honeyz sang their hits "Finally Found" and "End of the Line", before duetting with Another Level on the Help A London Child single "Holding Back the Years". This was followed later in the month by a performance at the 'Wicked Women' concert in Hyde Park, in aid of Breast Cancer Research. In September, the Honeyz supported Five at London's Brixton Academy and Manchester Apollo, in special one-off events organised in conjunction with Cadburys and MTV.

October 1999 saw the release of their fourth single, "Never Let You Down", a new track recorded for inclusion on a repackaged version of Wonder No.8, and the first single to feature the vocals of Mariama. The single entered into the UK Singles Chart at number 7, making it a fourth consecutive top 10 hit for the group.

Honeyz performed another newly recorded album track, "Won't Take It Lying Down", at the prestigious MOBO Awards, held on 6 October 1999 in the Royal Albert Hall, where they had picked up two nominations in the 'Best Newcomer' and 'Best R&B Act' categories. "Won't Take It Lying Down" went on to be released at the end of February 2000, reaching number 7. It became the last top 10 single the Honeyz would achieve. At the 2000 Maxim awards, they picked up the award for The Best British Girl Band, beating the Spice Girls, Hepburn, Thunderbugs and Eternal to the title. They were also nominated for Best British Breakthrough Act at the 2000 Brit Awards.

2000–2001: Abdi's return, canceled album and split
By summer 2000, a new song had been recorded, which was confirmed as not only the first single to be taken from a planned forthcoming new album, but also a chosen single from the Nutty Professor II: The Klumps original soundtrack, with the Honeyz featuring on the UK version alongside Sisqó and Janet Jackson. The single was called "Not Even Gonna Trip" and was initially scheduled for release in late September 2000.

It was during the run-up to the single release, in August, that Mariama Goodman announced her departure from Honeyz. Goodman's departure was due to constant clashing with Belkhiati: Cherry confirmed this in 2019 in a podcast called "Fascinated With Geardid Farrelly". Celena and Naima were faced with an uncertain future, and their management took the decision to bring Heavenli back into the group. Heavenli's vocals for the new single "Not Even Gonna Trip" was recorded and the official announcement of the renewed line-up was made on ITV's flagship children's programs SMTV Live and CD:UK, on Saturday 19 August 2000, along with a performance of "Finally Found", poignant in that it was the first-ever performance by a band on CD:UK on its launch almost two years earlier to the day, on 20 August 1998. "Not Even Gonna Trip" failed to reach the top 20 by the time it was released in late October, peaking at number 24. After this, the group worked hard on their second album.

Almost a year after the return of Heavenli, the group released new single "I Don't Know" on 5 August 2001, but with minimal exposure and promotion, the track did not chart as high as their previous single, stalling at number 28.

The group released another single – a song titled "Talk to the Hand" – in late 2001. A video was filmed and was played on major channels such as MTV Hits. However Mercury Records suddenly made the decision that it would be best to simply drop the group, without giving the single the chance of a release. Plans for the release of the group's second album Harmony were therefore canceled. Following this and a departure from their management, the group decided to go their separate ways in December 2001.

2005–2010: First reunion
In January 2005, the original line-up made a special appearance on the ITV singing contest Hit Me, Baby, One More Time, performing their debut single "Finally Found" and a cover of Nickelback's hit "How You Remind Me". The group returned officially in 2006 for a tour. Despite the appearance in 2005, Belkhiati did not want to return because she was focused on an acting career and was replaced by Celena's sister, Candace. Abdi left the band for the second time in August 2006 and was once again replaced by Goodman. They performed together on tour until 2010.

2012–2015: Second reunion

Despite Celena insisting in 2009 that there was "zero" chance of Honeyz ever getting back together, it was confirmed in October 2012 that Honeyz, along with Atomic Kitten, Liberty X, B*Witched, Five and 911, would be reuniting for the ITV2 reality-documentary series The Big Reunion on ITV2 at some time in 2013. Although Naima was in the original line-up and was with the group throughout their musical career, she decided not to take part in the re-formation. It was rumoured that Heavenli and Mariama would both have refused to take part if Belkhiati was in the group, but the group later revealed during an appearance on The Vault that Naima had other things going on in her life and was unable to take part in the reunion. The series, which began airing on 31 January 2013, followed the groups rehearsing for two weeks ahead of one major comeback performance at the London Hammersmith Apollo on 26 February 2013.

The Honeyz episode aired on 14 February 2013, in which Celena, Heavenli and Mariama discussed their time in the group and the reasons for the line-up changes. The episode ended with an emotional reunion between Heavenli and Celena, who had not spoken together since Heavenli left the group for the second time in 2006. It was also revealed that, contrary to press reports at the time, Heavenli was brought back into the group following Goodman's departure in 2000 at the insistence of the group's management and against the wishes of both Celena and Naima. However, elements of The Big Reunion were largely scripted for dramatic effects and failed to mention the real reason why Heavenli left the group in 1999 and who really invited her back to rejoin the group in 2000. On 16 February 2013, Heavenli herself wrote about the fictional storylines regarding the Honeyz on her Twitter page: "Adaptations of the truth... some actual, some factual, others spun into villain/victim stories for TV drama! #BigReunion amusing!" She was referring to how the show portrayed her as the villain and Celena as the victim.

The bands were originally only supposed to perform a one-off concert at London's Hammersmith Apollo on 26 February 2013, but when the entire show sold out in under five minutes shortly after the premiere of the first episode on 31 January 2013, rumors circulated that producers of the show were planning to tour the concert around the UK. On 11 February, it was confirmed that due to high demands for tickets and the popularity of the show, a full 12-date tour around the country would be taking place from 3–12 May 2013. Two further dates in Ireland and Northern Ireland were later added as well. On 27 March 2013 it was announced that the bands would perform a mini Christmas tour in December 2013.

Following an interview with The Vault in March 2013, the group confirmed that they were planning to record new material in the near future. During the arena tour, Honeyz revealed a new song, "Price You Pay", which they say they hope to release in Autumn 2013.

On 16 September 2013, Honeyz attended the 2013 National Reality Television Awards, where The Big Reunion was up for several awards. On 7 February 2014, they posted on their Facebook page that they were "Putting pen to paper and writing some great songs..." On 31 July the group announced that Heavenli decided to quit the band for the third time, leaving Celena and Mariama to continue as a duo.

On 20 November 2015, Honeyz released "Definitely Something", their first single in 14 years and first release as a duo.

2018–present: TV appearances
In 2018, Cherry auditioned for the twelfth series of Britain's Got Talent with her husband, Danny; their audition was shown on spin-off show Britain's Got More Talent. Judge Alesha Dixon, who was a member of fellow girl group Mis-Teeq, recognised her. When asked by Simon Cowell to tell the judges about themselves, Cherry said "I used to be in a girl group called the Honeyz", implying that the group had disbanded.

In January 2022, the duo appeared on series 7 of E4's Celebrity Coach Trip, joining fellow celebrity travellers in Portugal like Matt Richardson, Honey G, Paul Danan, Ginny Lemon and Birds of a Feather stars Linda Robson and Lesley Joseph. The duo were the first couple to be voted off the coach, receiving the red card and leaving in episode 5 after spending the day in Porto and Figueira da Foz.

On 3 September 2022, the duo appeared as a team on BBC's quiz show Pointless Celebrities, competing against other teams composed of fellow celebrity musicians.

Members

Current members 
Celena Cherry was born on 26 April 1977 in Hammersmith, London. She is an English singer and the lead singer of the Honeyz. Cherry teamed up with her cousin Alani (former Kleshay singer) to form Anotherside. They released one single together, "This Is Your Night", through V2 Records. In 2005 Cherry released her first solo album, Celena Cherry, through her official website. Cherry has also pursued an acting career, appearing in the soap operas Hollyoaks and Doctors.
Mariama Goodman was born on 26 October 1977 and is an English dancer and singer who has been a member of the bands Solid Harmonie and the Honeyz. Goodman began her pop career in 1996 signed to Jive Records in the United States with Solid Harmonie. In 1999, Goodman left Solid Harmonie, returned to the UK and was invited to join the Honeyz alongside Celena Cherry and Naima Belkhiati; former member Heavenli Abdi had left the Honeyz after two singles. Goodman announced her departure from the Honeyz in August 2000. She reunited with the Honeyz for The Big Reunion documentary on ITV2 in 2013. Goodman is a trained midwife and works as a community midwife in the National Health Service. Goodman has one daughter and married actor Andrew-Lee Potts on 20 August 2014.

Past members 
Heavenli Roberts (formerly known as Abdi and Denton) was born on 10 November 1974 in Paddington, London, England. She was an original member of the Honeyz, along with Celena Cherry and Naima Belkhiati, but left after the first two singles. She has since rejoined the group on several occasions, and most recently left the group a third time in summer 2014. She holds a BA honours degree in ceramic design from Central Saint Martins. Now divorced and known as Heavenli Roberts, she is co-director and co-owner of the Algarve International School, a columnist for Algarve Lifestyle Magazine and sings with the Algarve Jazz Orchestra on occasion. She is also a qualified aerobics instructor and used to run a children choir in the Algarve – the Algarve Juniors. Algarve, Portugal. She also used to date Peter Andre and Matthew Marsden. She has four children, Daisy-Mae, Jayden, Honey and Zachary.
Naima Belkhiati was born on 4 December 1973 in Avignon, Vaucluse, France. She was an original member of the Honeyz, along with Celena Cherry and Heavenli Denton. After the group split up, Belkhiati appeared in two motion picture films that were released in 2006, Alien Autopsy and Heroes and Villains.

Timeline

Discography

Studio albums
 Wonder No.8 (1998)

Tours
Headlining
 Wonder No.8 Tour (1998–1999)

Co-headlining
 Smash Hits Tour  (2000)
 The Big Reunion Tour  (2013)
 90s Pop Baby Tour  (2022)

References

External links
Honeyz at AllMusic
Honeyz at Discogs
Honeyz at Facebook
Honeyz at IMDb
Honeyz at Twitter

 
British contemporary R&B musical groups
British musical trios
Musical groups established in 1997
Musical groups disestablished in 2003
Musical groups reestablished in 2005
Musical groups disestablished in 2010
Musical groups reestablished in 2013
English girl groups
Black British musical groups
1997 establishments in England
2003 disestablishments in England
Ballad music groups
British R&B girl groups
Mercury Records artists
Def Jam Recordings artists